WHPF (88.1 FM) was a radio station licensed to Pittston Farm, Maine, United States. The station was owned by Light of Life Ministries, Inc.
 
On August 30, 2017, Light of Life Ministries requested cancellation of the license. The Federal Communications Commission cancelled the license on September 11, 2017.

References

External links

HPF
Somerset County, Maine
Radio stations established in 2010
2010 establishments in Maine
Defunct radio stations in the United States
Radio stations disestablished in 2017
2017 disestablishments in Maine
Defunct religious radio stations in the United States
HPF